Bluescape is a SaaS company based in Silicon Valley, California. Its visual collaboration platform is designed to allow users to collaborate remotely. The cloud-based solution is hardware agnostic and accessible through desktops, PCs, mobile devices (iOS and Android), multi-touch displays, apps and a browser-based solution. It allows an unlimited number of users to have access and collaborate on projects in real-time, using a shared workspace. Bluescape is preferred in many industries, including the media entertainment and film industry, consulting, financial services, life sciences, manufacturing, AEC, and government.

References

Companies based in San Carlos, California